Khanh Pham (born 1978) is an American politician and activist serving as a member of the Oregon House of Representatives from the 46th district. She assumed office on January 11, 2021.

Early life and education 
The daughter of refugees from Saigon, Vietnam, Pham was born in Oklahoma City, Oklahoma. She moved to Irvine, California with her parents when she was 11. She earned a Bachelor of Arts degree from Lewis & Clark College in 2001, studying sociology, anthropology, and political economy. She later earned a Master of Arts in urban studies from Portland State University.

Career 
In 2004 and 2005, Pham worked as a development associate at the Global Fund for Women. She then worked as a development associate for Hesperian Health Guides from 2005 to 2007 and as a family advocate and development associate at Refugee Transitions, a non-profit organization based in San Francisco. She worked as an associate director for the National Radio Project and was a PhD researcher at Portland State University, specializing in climate adaptation and equity planning. 

From 2015 to 2018, she was an environmental justice manager for the Asian Pacific American Network of Oregon. She also worked for OPAL Environmental Justice Oregon, and helped launch the Oregon Just Transition Alliance, which spun off as an independent statewide alliance in 2020.

Oregon House of Representatives 
After incumbent Democrat Alissa Keny-Guyer announced that she would not seek re-election in the 2020 election, Pham announced her candidacy to succeed her. Pham won the Democratic primary, defeating former County Commissioner Jeff Cogen. In the November 2020 general election, she did not face a Republican challenger. 

Pham assumed office on January 11, 2021. Following the 2021 Taliban offensive, Pham was chosen to lead a task force alongside representative Kayse Jama to coordinate the resettlement of 1,200 refugees from Afghanistan in Oregon.

Pham was reelected in the 2022 Oregon House of Representatives election.

Personal life 
Pham and her husband, Hector, have one daughter. She and her family live in the Jade District of Portland, Oregon.

References 

Living people
1978 births
American women of Vietnamese descent in politics
Politicians from Oklahoma City
People from Irvine, California
Oregon Democrats
Lewis & Clark College alumni
Portland State University alumni
Politicians from Portland, Oregon
21st-century American women
Asian-American people in Oregon politics